The St. John Baptist Church sometimes simply called Church of St. John, is a Catholic church located in the town of Acre in northern Israel.

It should not be confused with the Franciscan ″Terra Sancta Church″ in the same city. It is very close to the coast, near the lighthouse.

The present church was built by the Franciscans of the Holy Land Custody in 1737, at the site of a former church dedicated to St. Andrew. It works as a parish church for the Catholic community of Latin or Roman rite. It was renovated in 1947.

See also
Roman Catholicism in Israel
St. John Baptist Church (disambiguation)
Terra Sancta Church

References

Roman Catholic churches in Israel
JohnBaptist Church
Roman Catholic churches completed in 1737

External links